Terence DeCarlo Coles (born January 5, 1990), also known as T-Coles and De'Carlo, is a Brazilian-born American songwriter and recording artist who is credited with co-writing a number of successful songs by various artists.

Early life
Terence DeCarlo Coles was born on January 5, 1990, in Macau, Rio Grande do Norte, Brazil. His parents moved him and his family to the United States shortly after his birth. A very talented basketball player in high school, Coles received a full basketball scholarship to Midwestern University in Texas. He later began studies at University of California, Los Angeles (UCLA).

Career
In 2008 Coles began collaborating with Chris Brown as a songwriter. The two had a Billboard #1 hit in 2012 with Chris Brown's "Turn Up The Music". Around this time, Coles left the University of California to pursue songwriting full time and has since then collaborated with a number of artists, including Chris Brown, Jennifer Lopez, Rihanna, Enrique Iglesias, Cody Simpson, Asher Monroe, Pia Mia, and Boyz II Men. He also co-wrote and performed "Rude" with Leon "RoccStar" Youngblood as the only unsigned artist on the 50 Shades of Gray soundtrack (as Terence Coles).

Coles has also released three songs as a solo artist, "Lit Right Now", "Stand by Me" and "Mind Up".

Songwriting credits
Chris Brown - "Turn Up The Music" and "Won't Change"   
Jennifer Lopez - "A. K. A."
Tamar Braxton -"All The Way Home"
Jenna Andrews - "Mourning Sickness"
Asher Monroe - "Sign Your Love" and "Lonely Island"
Cody Simpson - "No Ceilings"
Prince Royce - "With You"
Boyz II Men - "Underwater" and "Better Half"
P9 - "New York Minute" and "Just The Two of Us"

References

External links 
 

American male songwriters
Living people
1990 births
University of California, Los Angeles alumni
Brazilian emigrants to the United States